Frederick County Poor Farm, also known as the Frederick County Poorhouse, is a historic poor farm complex located at Round Hill, Frederick County, Virginia. The main building, erected in 1820, is a Federal style building that consists of a two-story brick main block and original lateral one-story brick wings with gable roofs. A nearly identical building is at the Shenandoah County Farm. Also on the property are a contributing brick spring house, secondary dwelling, blacksmith shop, storage building, poultry house, and board-and-batten outbuilding. The Frederick County Poor Farm remained open until 1947.

It was listed on the National Register of Historic Places in 1993.

See also
 National Register of Historic Places listings in Frederick County, Virginia

References

External links
 

Poor farms
Farms on the National Register of Historic Places in Virginia
Government buildings on the National Register of Historic Places in Virginia
Federal architecture in Virginia
Government buildings completed in 1820
Buildings and structures in Frederick County, Virginia
National Register of Historic Places in Frederick County, Virginia
Blacksmith shops